Stadelbauer is a German language occupational surname for a "farmer" and may refer to:
Helen Stadelbauer (1910–2006), Canadian painter and educator
Lisa Stadelbauer, Canadian ambassador to Israel

References 

German-language surnames
Occupational surnames